Vietnam is the easternmost country on the Indochina Peninsula in Southeast Asia.

Vietnam or Viet Nam, may also refer to:

Places
 North Vietnam (formally the Democratic Republic of Vietnam), a former country that merged into Vietnam
 South Vietnam (formally the Republic of Vietnam, previously the State of Vietnam), a former country that was merged into Vietnam
 Empire of Vietnam, World War II Japanese-backed entity
 Colonial Vietnam, colony of France, consisting of three colonial and protectorate territories
 Kingdom of Vietnam, country of Vietnam prior to French conquest
 Namviet, ancient polity covering northern Vietnam

Military
 Vietnam War
 First Indochina War
 List of wars involving Vietnam

Music
 VietNam (band), a rock band from Brooklyn, New York, U.S.
 VietNam (album), a 2007 album by VietNam
 Vietnam (band), a post-punk/new wave band from Atlanta, Georgia, U.S.
 Vietnam (Revolutionary Ensemble album) (1972)
 Vietnam (Shockabilly album) (1984)
 "Vietnam", a 1970 song by Jimmy Cliff

Other uses
 Vietnam Airlines (IATA: VN; ICAO: HVN)
 Air Vietnam (IATA: VN; ICAO: AVN), defunct airline
 National sports teams of Vietnam, see sport in Vietnam

See also 

 
 
 Names of Vietnam
 Viet
 Nam (disambiguation)